This is a list of bodies that consider themselves to be authorities on standard languages, often called language academies. Language academies are motivated by, or closely associated with, linguistic purism and prestige, and typically publish prescriptive dictionaries, which purport to officiate and prescribe the meaning of words and pronunciations. A language regulator may also have a more descriptive approach, however, while maintaining and promoting (but not imposing) a standard spelling. Many language academies are private institutions, although some are governmental bodies in different states, or enjoy some form of government-sanctioned status in one or more countries. There may also be multiple language academies attempting to regulate and codify the same language, sometimes based in different countries and sometimes influenced by political factors.

Many world languages have one or more language academies or official language bodies. However, the degree of control that the academies exert over these languages does not render the latter controlled natural languages in the sense that the various kinds of "simple English" (e.g. Basic English, Simplified Technical English) or George Orwell's fictional Newspeak are. They instead remain natural languages to a considerable extent and are thus not formal languages such as Attempto Controlled English. They have a degree of standardization that allows them to function as standard languages (e.g. standard French). The English language has never had a formal regulator anywhere, outside of private productions such as the Oxford Dictionary.

Natural languages

Auxiliary languages

Esperanto 

Apart from the Akademio de Esperanto, most auxiliary languages, also known as constructed languages (Conlangs) have no true linguistic regulators, language academies.

Esperanto and Ido have been constructed (or planned) by a person or small group, before being adopted and further developed by communities of users through natural language evolution.

Bodies such as the Akademio de Esperanto look at questions of usage in the light of the original goals and principles of the language.

Other constructed languages

Interlingua 
The auxiliary language Interlingua has no regulating body, as its vocabulary, grammar, and orthography are viewed as a product of ongoing social forces. In theory, Interlingua therefore evolves independent from any human regulator. Interlingua's vocabulary is verified and recorded by dynamically applying certain general principles to an existing set of natural languages and their etymologies. The International Auxiliary Language Association ceased to exist in 1954, and according to the secretary of Union Mundial de Interlingua "Interlingua doesn't need its Academy".

Other bodies 
These bodies do not attempt to regulate any language in a prescriptive manner and are primarily concerned with aiding and advising the government on policies regarding language usage.
 : Official Language Division Civil Service Bureau Government of Hong Kong – concerned with matters concerning government language policy
 : Departamento dos Assuntos Linguísticos of the Public Administration and Civil Service Bureau of the Government of Macau –concerned with matters concerning government language policy

See also 
 Proposals for an English Academy
 Language policy
 Language revival
 Language planning
 Linguistic purism
 Languages in censuses

References 

Lists of organizations
Regulators